The prehistory of North Africa spans the period of earliest human presence in the region to gradual onset of  historicity in the Maghreb (Berber:Tamazgha) during classical antiquity. Early anatomically modern humans are known to have been present at Jebel Irhoud, in what is now Morocco, approximately 300,000 years ago. The Nile Valley region, via ancient Egypt, contributed to the Neolithic, Bronze Age and Iron Age periods of the Old World, along with the ancient Near East.

Climate

Human habitation in North Africa has been greatly influenced by the climate of the Sahara (currently the world's largest warm desert), which has undergone enormous variations between wet and dry over the last few hundred thousand years. This is due to a 41,000-year Axial tilt cycle in which the tilt of the earth changes between 22° and 24.5°. At present (2000 CE), we are in a dry period, but it is expected that the Sahara will become green again in 15,000 years (17,000 CE).

During the last glacial period, the Sahara was much larger than it is today, extending south beyond its current boundaries. The end of the glacial period brought more rain to the Sahara, from about 8000 BCE to 6000 BCE, perhaps because of low pressure areas over the collapsing ice sheets to the north. Once the ice sheets were gone, the northern Sahara dried out. In the southern Sahara, the drying trend was initially counteracted by the monsoon, which brought rain further north than it does today. By around 4200 BCE, however, the monsoon retreated south to approximately where it is today, leading to the gradual desertification of the Sahara. The Sahara is presently as dry as it was about 13,000 years ago.

These conditions are responsible for what has been called the Sahara pump theory. During periods of a wet or "Green Sahara", the Sahara becomes a savanna grassland and various flora and fauna become more common. Following inter-pluvial arid periods, the Sahara area then reverts to desert conditions and the flora and fauna are forced to retreat northwards to the Atlas Mountains, southwards into West Africa, or eastwards into the Nile Valley. This separates populations of some of the species in areas with different climates, forcing them to adapt, possibly giving rise to allopatric speciation.

Lower Paleolithic

The earliest inhabitants of central North Africa have left behind significant remains: early remnants of hominid occupation in North Africa, for example, were found in Ain el Hanech, in Setif (c. 200,000 BCE); in fact, more recent investigations have found signs of Oldowan technology, which has been dated between 2,000,000 BCE and 1,470,000 BCE.

Middle Paleolithic

Early anatomically modern humans are known to have been present at Jebel Irhoud, in what is now Morocco, approximately 300,000 years ago.

Human groups of Nazlet Sabaha, Egypt engaged in chert mining, as early as ~100,000 years ago, likely for use as tools.

In the Sahara, Aterians camped near lakes, rivers, and springs, and engaged in the activity of hunting (e.g., antelope, buffalo, elephant, rhinoceros) and some gathering. As a result of a hyper-aridification event of Saharan Africa, which occurred around the time of Europe's Würm glaciation event, Aterian hunter-gatherers may have migrated into areas of tropical Africa and coastal Africa. More specifically, amid aridification in MIS 5 and regional change of climate in  MIS 4, in the Sahara and the Sahel, Aterians may have migrated southward into West Africa (e.g.,  Baie du Levrier, Mauritania; Tiemassas, Senegal; Lower Senegal River Valley).

Upper Paleolithic

The Iberomaurusian culture seems to have appeared around the time of the Last Glacial Maximum, somewhere between c. 25,000 cal BP and 23,000 cal BP. It would have lasted until the early Holocene, c. 11,000 cal BP.

Archaeological evidence has attested that population settlements occurred in Nubia as early as the Late Pleistocene and from the 5th millennium BCE onwards, whereas there is "no or scanty evidence" of human presence in the Egyptian Nile Valley during these periods, which may be due to problems in site preservation.

Mesolithic

The Capsian culture was a Mesolithic and Neolithic culture of the Maghreb that persisted between 8000 BCE and 2700 BCE.

The engraved Central Saharan rock art of the Bubaline Period was created between 10,000 BP and 7500 BP. 

The engraved Central Saharan rock art of the Kel Essuf Period was created prior to 9800 BP. 

The painted Central Saharan rock art of the Round Head Period was created between 9800 BP and 7500 BP.

Neolithic

Neolithic agriculturalists, who may have resided in Northeast Africa and the Near East, may have been the source population for lactase persistence variants, including –13910*T, and may have been subsequently supplanted by later migrations of peoples. The Sub-Saharan West African Fulani, the North African Tuareg, and European agriculturalists, who are descendants of these Neolithic agriculturalists, share the lactase persistence variant –13910*T. While shared by Fulani and Tuareg herders, compared to the Tuareg variant, the Fulani variant of –13910*T has undergone a longer period of haplotype differentiation. The Fulani lactase persistence variant –13910*T may have spread, along with cattle pastoralism, between 9686 BP and 7534 BP, possibly around 8500 BP; corroborating this timeframe for the Fulani, by at least 7500 BP, there is evidence of herders engaging in the act of milking in the Central Sahara. The engraved and painted Central Saharan rock art of the Pastoral Period was created between 7500 BP and 2800 BP. One of the earliest Libyco-Berber inscriptions in Africa are found in Wadi Mertoutek, near or within a petroglyph, which may be the depiction of a bovid, and may be associated with a pastoral community during a period of pastoralism.

Human remains were found by archaeologists in 2000 at a site known as Gobero in the Ténéré Desert of northeastern Niger. The Gobero finds represent a uniquely preserved record of human habitation and burials from what is now called the Kiffian (7700 BCE – 6200 BCE) and the Tenerian (5200 BCE – 2500 BCE) cultures.

The classic account of the riparian lifestyle of this period comes from investigations in Sudan during World War II by British archeologist Anthony Arkell. Arkell's report described a Late Stone Age settlement on a sandbank of the Blue Nile which was then about  higher than its present flood stage. The countryside was clearly savanna, not the present-day desert, as evidenced by the bones of the most common species found in the middens — antelope, which require large expanses of seed-bearing grasses. These people probably lived mainly on fish, however, and Arkell concluded, based on the totality of the evidence, that rainfall at the time was at least three times that of today. The physical characteristics derived from skeletal remains suggested that these people were related to modern Nilotic peoples, such as the Nuer and Dinka. Subsequent radiocarbon dating firmly established Arkell's site to between 7000 BCE and 5000 BCE. Based on common patterns at his site and at French-excavated sites already reported from Chad, Mali and Niger (e.g., bone harpoons and a characteristic "wavy line" pottery), Arkell inferred "a common fishing and hunting culture spread by negroid people right across Africa at about the latitude of Khartoum at a time when the climate was so different that it was not desert." Hunter-fishers, who created the wavy line pottery in 6700 BCE, were black African rather than Mediterranean in origin and showed signs of intentional cultivation of grain crops instead of simply gathering wild grains.

Several scholars have argued that the African origins of the Egyptian civilisation derived from pastoral communities which emerged in both the Egyptian and Sudanese regions of the Nile Valley in the 5th millennium BCE.

Dotted wavy line pottery and fishing cultures have also been located in the Lake Turkana region in poorly dated contexts. By 3000 BCE, it does not appear that the Turkana Basin was populated with harpoon and dotted wavy line pottery users, but fishing remained an important part of peoples' diets into the late Holocene.

The engraved Central Saharan rock art of the Caballine Period was created between 2800 BP and 1000 BP.

The engraved and painted Central Saharan rock art of the Cameline Period was created from 2000 BP onward.

Bronze Age

Egypt

In Ancient Egypt, the Bronze Age begins in the Protodynastic period,  3150 BCE. The archaic Early Bronze Age of Egypt, known as the Early Dynastic Period of Egypt, immediately follows the unification of Lower and Upper Egypt,  3100 BCE. It is generally taken to include the First and Second Dynasties, lasting from the Protodynastic Period of Egypt until about 2686 BCE, or the beginning of the Old Kingdom. With the First Dynasty, the capital moved from Abydos to Memphis with a unified Egypt ruled by an Egyptian god-king. Abydos remained the major holy land in the south. The hallmarks of ancient Egyptian civilization, such as art, architecture and many aspects of religion, took shape during the Early Dynastic Period. Memphis in the Early Bronze Age was the largest city of the time. The Old Kingdom of the regional Bronze Age is the name given to the period in the 3rd millennium BCE when Egypt attained its first continuous peak of civilization in complexity and achievement – the first of three "Kingdom" periods, which mark the high points of civilization in the lower Nile Valley (the others being Middle Kingdom and the New Kingdom).

Maghreb

The Maghreb transferred from the Mesolithic stage to the Neolothic stage between the 6th millennium BCE and 5th millennium BCE, then entered an intermediary period between Neolithic, Chalcolithic and the Bronze Age probably in the 2nd millennium BCE, although they never truly transferred into either the Chalcolithic Age or the Bronze Age, remaining in between them and the Neolithic Age.

Iron Age

Egypt

The Iron Age in Egypt corresponds to the Third Intermediate Period of Egypt. Iron metal is singularly scarce in collections of Egyptian antiquities. Bronze remained the primary material there until the conquest by Neo-Assyrian Empire in 671 BCE. The explanation of this would seem to be that the relics are in most cases the paraphernalia of tombs, the funeral vessels and vases, and iron being considered an impure metal by the ancient Egyptians it was never used in their manufacture of these or for any religious purposes. It was attributed to Seth, the spirit of evil who according to Egyptian tradition governed the central deserts of Africa. In the Black Pyramid of Abusir, dating before 2000 BCE, Gaston Maspero found some pieces of iron. In the funeral text of Pepi I, the metal is mentioned. A sword bearing the name of pharaoh Merneptah as well as a battle axe with an iron blade and gold-decorated bronze shaft were both found in the excavation of Ugarit. A dagger with an iron blade found in Tutankhamun's tomb, 13th century BCE, was recently examined and found to be of meteoric origin.

Maghreb

Iron-working Phoenician colonization along the coast and trade with the inland caused the Maghreb to rapidly transfer from this intermediary stage to the Iron Age.

See also

 Prehistoric Egypt
 Ancient Libya
 Garamantes

Notes

References

External links

Original text: Library of Congress Country Study of Algeria
AFRICA DURING THE LAST 150,000 YEARS (climate) from ORNL

History of North Africa
History of the Sahara
Prehistoric Africa
Stone Age Africa